The Central Bank of Ecuador (BCE, per its abbreviation in Spanish) is an institution of the Executive Function, which has institutional, administrative, financial, and technical autonomy. It is in charge of executing the monetary policy established by the Monetary Policy and Regulation Board of Ecuador, which is the highest governing body of this institution since October 2021.
 
Between 1927 and 2000, the Central Bank was in charge of issuing "Sucres" coins and banknotes, but this function ceased after the adoption of the US dollar as the country's legal currency on January 9, 2000.

Currently, the objective of the Central Bank of Ecuador is to strengthen dollarization, guarantee technical autonomy and be at the service of the citizens. The BCE is the administrator of the international reserves, contributing directly to the preservation of economic stability. It promotes the use of monetary payment methods and fostering monetary education. Additionally the BCE generates macroeconomic statistics in a technical manner, and guarantees the availability of banknotes and coins in the Ecuadorian territory.

Central Bank of Ecuador’s Logo
On February 4, 1976, the Central Bank of Ecuador adopted as its logo the Golden Sun from La Tolita culture, from the northern coastal region of Ecuador. The Golden Sun is a mask with a headdress that represents the mixture between a star and an animal. It has 48 rays distributed in a serpent form.

History

Background
In the first three decades of the twentieth century, the Ecuadorian economic and financial system was characterized by permanent macroeconomic, financial and monetary problems, such as the lack of control of monetary emission and private banks activities.

This situation was aggravated even more by the international context of World War I and the inflationary and deflationary problems that led to the Great Depression of 1929. Before this global crisis, during the first five years of the 1920s, the international demand for cacao, Ecuador's main export product of the time, suffered a big price fall accompanied by pest problems in some of its crops, leading to economic crisis and political instability.

Foundation

The economic and political crisis led to the revolt of young army officers on July 9, 1925, known as the Revolución Juliana, which was generated in the midst of growing social discontent.

Luis Napoleon Dillon, Minister of Finance at the time and one of the main figures of the Revolución Juliana, is considered the first promoter of creating an Ecuadorian Central Bank. His objective was to establish an institution or organization for issuing currency, making transfers, depositing and discounting of the State.

Dillon's proposal did not succeed, although the "Law of the Ecuadorian Central Bank" was approved on October 9, 1925. Nevertheless, on January 10 of the following year the first Board resigned, including Dillon.

In spite of this, the idea matured with the leadership of Isidro Ayora, one of the main promoters of the Revolución Juliana. Under his administration, on June 26, 1926, the Caja Central de Emisión y Amortización was created, entity in charge of officially recognizing the total amount of means of payment and provisionally authorizing the circulation of banknotes. Later, on October 18 of that year, President Isidro Ayora ordered the authorized banks to issue currency to deliver to the Caja Central de Emisión certain amounts of gold and silver which, in total, represented ten million six hundred thousand sucres. Due to the critical situation of the economy, the Provisional Board invited the researcher, economist and finance professor at Princeton University, Edwin Kemmerer, to advise on the adoption of an extensive set of modernizing economic measures, among them, the creation of a central bank.

On February 11, 1927, the “Kemmerer Mission” presented the Central Bank Organic Law to the government for their consideration, accompanied with a statement of reasons, in which they suggested that this institution should become an authorized printing money company for 50 years, apply fixed-rate rediscounting, become a depository for the government and associated banks, manage the foreign exchange market and act as fiscal agent.

The creation of the Central Bank of Ecuador responded to the need to implement reforms to strengthen and organize the country's financial and monetary system, considering the difficulties of that time such as: unsupported issuance, price increases, speculation, credit and payments balance problems.

This bill was approved by President Isidro Ayora on March 4, 1927, and published in the Official Register No. 283, on March 12, 1927. The preparation of the new central bank operation was in charge of an Organizing Commission, appointed by Ayora himself. On June 3 of the same year, the statutes were approved, after overcoming several operational difficulties between the Caja Central de Emisión and the new institution. On June 4 the first Board of Directors was formed, presided by Neptalí Bonifaz as president.

Finally, on August 10, 1927, the Central Bank of Ecuador opened its doors in the building of the Compañía de Crédito Agrícola e Industrial, on the corner of García Moreno and Bolívar streets, in the Historic Center of Quito. Later, on November 23, 1927, the Central Bank moved its offices to a new building acquired from Banco del Pichincha, located at the intersection of Garcia Moreno and Sucre Streets, where it remained until 1968. Currently, this building is the Numismatic Museum of the Central Bank of Ecuador (Museo Numismático del Banco Central del Ecuador).
 
On August 25, 1927, the BCE's main branch was inaugurated in the city of Guayaquil and on June 7, 1928, it began operations in the city of Cuenca.

Since 1968, the BCE's main building in the city of Quito is located at Av. 10 de Agosto N11-409 and Briceño. In the city of Guayaquil, it is located at Edificio Ex Suizo, Francisco P. Icaza No. 203, between Pedro Carbo and Pichincha streets; and in the city of Cuenca, at Calle Larga and Huayna Cápac.

Conflict years in the economy
Stabilizing and unifying the currency were the initial objectives of the new organization. To achieve this, the Central Bank used the gold standard, as the monetary regime that fixed the price of the sucre in terms of gold. The basic obligation of the monetary authority was to keep this price fixed at 0.300933 grams of fine gold, i.e. one fifth of the fine gold content of the U.S. dollar at that time. This convertibility corresponded with the world economic crisis and the Great Depression (1929).

From then on, the traditional policy of deficit spending and credit to the National Government from the Central Bank was resumed, as it occurred between 1915 and 1925.

Central Bank reforms
Price instability driven by fiscal spending and expansionary monetary policy forced another consultant, Manuel Gómez Morín, to reform the Central Bank Law and related monetary regulations. On December 30, 1937, a new Organic Law of the Central Bank of Ecuador came into effect. The highest governing body of the Central Bank became the board of directors.

In the vision of this Mexican expert Gómez Morín, the monetary authority should channel credit to the economic sectors considered critical in the development process. Together with the Guayaquil banker Víctor Emilio Estrada, he advised assigning the Central Bank of Ecuador the central role in determining the types of loans offered by private banks to the productive sector by modifying the discount rate. Nevertheless, there were numerous difficulties for implementing the recommendations stated by the Gómez Morín Commission.

Third reform and Monetary Board
After the end of World War II, a new upturn in inflation, together with serious balance of payments problems, made it necessary -once again- to call in foreign experts. The then Manager of the Central Bank of Ecuador, Guillermo Pérez Chiriboga, called Robert Triffin, an expert from the Federal Reserve System of the United States. The Harvard University consultant proposed replacing the Organic Law of the Central Bank with the Monetary Regime Law and the International Exchange Law, which came into effect on March 12, 1948.

Under the new law, the highest governing body of the Central Bank of Ecuador became the Monetary Board, in which the Government also participated, as a sign of its co-responsibility in the design of monetary policy. The Board also had the power to devalue the currency and execute counter-cyclical policies. In addition, the Central Bank was authorized to grant loans to the State and the productive sector, as well as to promote an accounting system that allowed it to assume the new functions. The ultimate goal of the entity was to achieve price stability and the preservation of a solvent financial situation.

Impact of the Latin American debt crisis
For more than three decades this monetary regime successfully faced innumerable shocks. However, the severity of the Latin American external debt crisis of the 1980s and 1990s, led some countries, such as Ecuador, to make adjustments to reorganize their public finances. On May 7, 1992, the Monetary Regime and State Bank Law was approved, enabling the Central Bank of Ecuador to intervene in the financial system through open market operations. In addition, the Monetary Board was replaced by a Board of Directors of the BCE led by an assigned President, differentiating the path between government influence and BCE autonomy.

Subsequently, in the 1998 Constitution, the Central Bank of Ecuador enshrined its technical autonomy, which gave it a leading role in the management of the 1999 banking crisis, that ended with the Sucre as the national currency and the implementation of dollarization. The adoption of the dollarization model led to changes in the main functions of the BCE, once it ceased to issue the Sucre.

A decade later, in the 2008 Constitution, the Central Bank's autonomy was eliminated, turning it into an institution dependent on the central government. During this period, the Central Bank made loans to the Executive.

Finally, the Central Bank of Ecuador recovered its technical autonomy on April 22, 2021, with the approval of the Organic Reformatory Law to the Organic Monetary and Financial Code for the Defense of the Dollarization, reforms that were approved by the National Assembly on April 22, 2021, and published in the Supplement to the Official Registry No. 443 of May 3 of the same year.

Among the first actions taken by the institution under the new legal framework was the agreement reached between the Central Bank of Ecuador and the Ministry of Economy and Finance (MEF), signed on June 30, 2021, whereby the BCE returned to the MEF the shares it held in public banks (Corporación Financiera Nacional (CFN), BanEcuador and Corporación Nacional de Finanzas Populares (Conafips)). Those shares were received on May 18, 2017, as dation in payment for the resources delivered at the time to the Government in office. The amount that the MEF will deliver to the BCE by 2035 is US$2,378 million.

Governing Body of the Central Bank of Ecuador

As established by the current Organic Monetary and Financial Code, the highest governing body of the Central Bank of Ecuador is the Monetary Policy and Regulation Board, which is responsible of formulating monetary policy and observing its implementation by the BCE, in order to preserve the integrity and sustainability of the monetary system of dollarization and the Ecuadorian financial system.

The members of this new body were elected and sworn in by the National Assembly on October 12, 2021. The current members of the Monetary Policy and Regulation Board are: Tatiana Rodríguez Cerón, Paulina Garzón Alvear and Wilson Pérez Oviedo.

Presidents / General managers 1927 - 2022

Neptalí Bonifaz, 1927-1929
Enrique Cuerva, 1929-1932
Temistocles Terán, 1932
Alberto Bustamante, 1932-1933
Alberto Larrea Chiriboga, 1933-1936
Luis Calisto Mestanza, 1936
Fidel A. López Arteta, 1936-1937
Alberto Wither Navarro, 1937
Heliodoro Sáenz, 1937-1938
Augusto Bueno Mancheno, 1938
Alberto Ordeñana Cortéz, 1938-1939
Alejandro Ponce Borja, 1939-1940
Alberto Alcívar Destrouge, 1940-1944
José María Falconi, 1944
Guillermo Pérez Chiriboga, 1944-1960
Nicolas Fuentes Avellán, 1960-1963
Guillermo Pérez Chiriboga, 1963-1966
Jorge Pareja Martínez, 1967-1969
Joaquín Zevallos Menéndez, 1969-1972
Federico Intriago Arrata, 1972
Eduardo Larrea Stacey, 1972-1973
Germaníco Espinoza Zambrano, 1973-1976
Danilo Carrera Drouet, 1976
Rodrigo Espinosa Bermeo, 1976-1979
Germánico Salgado, 1979
Mauricio Dávalos Guevara, 1979-1981
Abelardo Pachano, 1981-1984
Carlos Julio Emanuel Morán, 1984-1987
Fernando Herrero Sevilla, 1987-1988
José Morillo Batlle, 1988-1990
Eduardo Valencia, 1990-1991
Eduardo Samaniego, 1991-1992
Ana Lucía Armijos, 1992-1993
Augusto de la Torre, 1993-1996-?
Fidel Jaramillo, ?-1997-1998-?
Luis Jácome Hidalgo, ?-1999-?
Modesto Correa, ?-2000-?
José Luis Ycaza, ?-2001
Mauricio Yépez, 2001-2004
Mauricio Pareja, 2004
José Cucalón, 2004-2005
José Jouvin Vernaza, 2005-2006
Eduardo Cabezas Molina, 2006-2008
Robert Andrade, 2008
Carlos Vallejo López, 2008-2009
Diego Borja, 2009-2011
Pedro Delgado Campaña, 2011-2012
Jeannette Sanchez, 2012-2013
Diego Martínez Vinueza, 2013, 
Madeleine Abarca, Dec 2016 - 2017
Verónica Artola, June 2017 - June 2021
Guillermo Avellán, June 2021 - October 2021 
Tatiana Rodríguez, October 2021 - Today

General managers from 2013
Mateo Villalba, 2013-2015
Eugenio Paladines Camacho, 2015.
Diego Martínez Vinueza, 2015-2016
Madeleine Abarca, Dec 2016 - 2017
Verónica Artola, June 2017 - June 2021
Guillermo Avellán, June 2021 - Today

Mission and Vision
Once Ecuador adopted the dollarization system on January 9, 2000, which implied that it stopped issuing the national currency, the functions of the Central Bank of Ecuador were modified, as set forth in the new Organic Statute issued through Executive Decree No. 1589 of June 13, 2001.

After the latest modifications introduced by the Reformatory Organic Law to the Organic Monetary and Financial Code of May 2021, and the reforms to the Organic Statute of Organizational Management by Processes of the BCE issued by the former Monetary and Financial Policy and Regulation Board on September 8, 2021, the mission and functions of the Central Bank of Ecuador are as follows:

Mission: To guarantee monetary stability, dollarization, the provision of safe and efficient means of payment, and the generation of macroeconomic studies and statistics to contribute to the welfare of society and the economic and financial stability of the country.

Vision: To be an institution of high technical capacity, a reference in digital transformation and recognized for its integrity, transparency and service vocation.

Central Bank of Ecuador Functions
The main functions assigned to the Central Bank of Ecuador in Article 36 of the Organic Monetary and Financial Code as amended in 2021 by means of the Organic Reformatory Law to the Organic Monetary and Financial Code for the Defense of Dollarization are as follows:

 It is in charge of implementing monetary policy, through the interest rate methodology and the establishment of the required  banking reserve, in order to promote the sustainability of the monetary and financial system.
 It is the fiscal and financial agent of the State. Therefore, public institutions must deposit their resources in the Central Bank in order to execute their payment orders.
 It manages and preserves the country's international reserves, which are conformed by cash, monetary gold and deposits from the public and private sectors, in order to guarantee the payment of goods and services.
 It facilitates the availability of banknotes and coins in the necessary quantity, quality and denominations. This way, it guarantees the availability of cash on a national scale.
 Manages the Central Payment System, where transactions made by citizens are channeled. It also promotes modern and efficient payment methods that promote financial inclusion.
 Through its Centralized Securities Depository (DCV, per its abbreviation in Spanish) it has custody, clears and settles securities traded in the Ecuadorian stock market.
 Prepares, analyzes and publishes macroeconomic studies and statistics in a technical and transparent manner to facilitate decision making.
The BCE is in charge of contracting external loans for the financing of the external sector.
 Acquires non-monetary gold from small-scale mining in the domestic market.
 It acts as trustee of the Liquidity Fund Trusts of the private and popular and solidarity financial systems.

Services offered by the Central Bank of Ecuador
 Exchange of monetary species of United States dollar banknotes and coins in all their denominations, through customer service counters and coin dispensing machines.
 Provision of dollars on a national scale, ensuring economic activities as a whole, in coordination with the Federal Reserve of the United States for the import of banknotes.
 Administration of the Interbank Payment System (SPI), through which electronic money transfers are executed between clients of different financial institutions, ensuring the provision of safe and efficient payment mechanisms.
 Purchase of non-monetary gold from small-scaled miners, through the offices of the Central Bank in the cities of Quito and Machala.
 Administration and preparation of the registry of Auxiliary Payment Systems, which are entities authorized by the Central Bank of Ecuador to transfer monetary resources, such as collection of public funds, transfer of remittances, transactional switch for payment services, among others.
 Generation and publication of macroeconomic statistics on a daily, weekly, monthly, semi-annual and annual basis, as well as specialized economic studies.
 Online issuance and renewal of electronic signature certificates used by individuals and companies on invoices and electronic documents.
 Clearing and settlement of securities traded by individuals and companies, such as shares, bonds, certificates of deposit, commercial invoices, among others, through the Centralized Securities Depository. This entity guards these securities ​​and generates a return for their holders.
 Preservation of the economic memory and the history of means of payment in Ecuador, detailed through the five interactive thematic rooms of the Numismatic Museum: Pre-Hispanic Period, Colony, XIX Century, XX Century and Central Bank. Its collection consists of numismatic products (coins), notaphilic (bills), scripophile (commercial documents such as shares and bonds), philatelic (stamps) and medallistic (medals). The Numismatic Museum is in Quito and Cuenca.
 The Economic Library of the Central Bank of Ecuador makes available to citizens more than 26,000 books and more than 1,000 serial titles (magazines, newsletters, yearbooks, among others), in addition to a digital bibliographic catalog and consultation in specialized databases, such as Scopus, Jove, Ebsco, Elsevier, Oxford Academic, Scientific American, among others.

Certifications
One of the main goals of the Central Bank of Ecuador, is fighting against corruption by promoting transparency in institutional management. For this reason, in November 2020, the BCE obtained ISO 37001 certification for the implementation of an Anti-bribery Management System (ABMS), for the purpose of prohibiting, preventing, detecting, and punishing acts of bribery.

The ABMS operates through three BCE departments:

• The Division of Processes, Quality, and Innovation, which oversees internal and external audits;
• The Division of Operational Risks, which evaluates the likelihood of bribery;
• The Division of Compliance, which receives and manages complaints, including those reported via the new complaint button on the BCE website.

The ISO 37001 certification strengthens organizational culture and enables a process-based management system for continuous improvement, elaboration of procedures, mitigation, and contingency plans. This system takes into consideration the risks faced by the BCE due to its size and the complexity of its operations. The BCE successfully obtained the renewal of this certification in 2022.

Organic structure of the Central Bank
The highest governing body of the Central Bank of Ecuador is the Monetary Policy and Regulation Board.

The BCE has a General Management Office, a General Deputy Management Office, a Deputy Programming and Regulation Office, a Deputy Operations Office and a Deputy Services Office. Each Deputy Office is composed of several Directorates.

Additionally, there are four General Coordinations: Strategic Planning and Management, Legal, Information and Communication Technologies, and Financial Administration. Each Coordination has different specific Directorates to fulfill its functions.

Finally, there are two Zonal Directorates, in the cities of Guayaquil and Cuenca, and also an office in the city of Machala for the purchase of non-monetary gold from small-scale mining.

International Reserves of Ecuador
The International reserves (IR) are the economic resources available to the country to support payments abroad that must be made by the State, companies or individuals through financial institutions. These reserves are managed by the Central Bank of Ecuador, according to the investment policy approved by the Monetary Policy and Regulation Board, and under the principles of security, liquidity, diversification and profitability.

International reserves are mainly composed of oil and non-oil exports, deposits of coins and bills made by banks in the Central Bank's vaults, and disbursements received by the country from multilateral organizations.

Ecuador's international reserves reached their historically highest point in March 2022, when they were at US$9,226.3 million. These levels of international reserves have allowed meeting a historical milestone, allowing to cover with these liquid assets 100% of the deposits of public and private financial entities in the BCE.

See also

Ministry of Economy and Finance (Ecuador)
Economy of Ecuador
Banking in Ecuador

References

External links
 Junta de Política y Regulación Monetaria
 Banco Central del Ecuador
 Sitio de Información Económica y Estadística
 Museo Numismático del Banco Central del Ecuador
 Biblioteca Económica del Banco Central del Ecuador
 Economía Tricolor

Ecuador
Economy of Ecuador
1927 establishments in Ecuador
Banks established in 1927